Norman Dale "Buddy" Baker (January 4, 1918 – July 26, 2002) was an American composer who scored many Disney films, including The Apple Dumpling Gang in 1975, The Apple Dumpling Gang Rides Again in 1979, The Shaggy D.A. in 1976, The Many Adventures of Winnie the Pooh in 1977, and The Fox and the Hound in 1981. He also composed scores for Disney theme park attractions, including Great Moments with Mr. Lincoln and The Haunted Mansion.

Biography

Baker was born and raised in Springfield, Missouri, and got his degree in music from Southwest Baptist College. He moved to the West Coast in the 1930s to arrange music scores for radio, and became the musical director for Bob Hope's radio show.

Career

One of Baker's first hits as a big band arranger was "And Her Tears Flowed Like Wine" for the Stan Kenton Orchestra. He later became a professor at L.A. City College in the early 1950s. Among his early students were film composer Jerry Goldsmith and jazz drummer Louis Bellson, with whom he composed and arranged Journey Into Love (Norgran, 1954).

At about this time, his friend George Bruns asked him to compose music for the Disney television show Davy Crockett and the River Pirates. He stayed on at the Disney studio, and eventually became its music director, as well as chief composer for Disneyland and other Disney theme parks.

Baker was nominated for an Academy Award for his score for the 1972 film Napoleon and Samantha. His work is heard in many Disney cartoons and featurettes, including Donald in Mathmagic Land, which was nominated for a 1959 Academy Award (Best Documentary - Short Subjects). In 1978, he composed the music for the first Walt Disney Home Video logo, known as the "Neon Mickey" logo—a loud string and brass fanfare with a piano and timpani beats.

Baker arranged and conducted most of the Winnie-the-Pooh musical featurettes. He also conducted the music for The Many Adventures of Winnie the Pooh theme park attractions in 1999, at age 81.

The eerie music heard throughout The Haunted Mansion at Disneyland was another of Baker's works, as was the infectious theme to Walt Disney World's If You Had Wings. He arranged the medley of French classical music that accompanies the film Impressions de France at EPCOT Center, which artfully integrates works by Camille Saint-Saëns, Claude Debussy and Erik Satie, among others. He also wrote the music for the Tokyo DisneySea theme park attraction Journey to the Center of the Earth, which opened in 2001.

Baker was named a "Disney Legend" in 1989. He has an honorary Main Street window over the Car Barn at  Disneyland Park, which reads: "Plaza School of Music - Sheet Music – B. Baker."

Awards and honors
In 1998, Baker was inducted as a Disney Legend. Baker also received the honor of having his name appear on Main Street, U.S.A. windows at DisneyWorld.  The window, which can be found above the Car Barn reads: Plaza School of Music - Sheet Music—-Baker.

Later years and death

Baker retired from Disney as the last staff composer still on contract at any studio. Although he occasionally returned to work on theme park, film and television projects, he spent most of his later years teaching film scoring at the USC Thornton School of Music in Los Angeles, where he remained until his death from natural causes at age 84 in 2002. He was interred at Forest Lawn – Hollywood Hills Cemetery. In 2004, his wife Charlotte donated his papers to the Fales Library at New York University.

Selected filmography

References

External links
 
 The Fales Library Guide to the Buddy Baker Papers
 
 

1918 births
2002 deaths
20th-century American composers
20th-century American male musicians
American film score composers
American male film score composers
Animated film score composers
Burials at Forest Lawn Memorial Park (Hollywood Hills)
Disney imagineers
Exclusive Records artists
Musicians from Springfield, Missouri
Southwest Baptist University alumni
USC Thornton School of Music faculty
Walt Disney Animation Studios people
Disney Legends